Gennady Aleksandrovich Nizhegorodov  (born 7 June 1977) is a Russian football manager and a former player.

Club career
Nizhegorodov began his career at FC Volgar-Gazprom Astrakhan in Russia in 1993. In 1996, he moved to FC Lokomotiv Nizhny Novgorod, before moving to FC Lokomotiv Moscow in 2000, where he stayed until 2004, making 125 appearances for the club. He moved to Chechnya club, FC Terek Grozny in 2004, but only played 10 games before moving to FC Shinnik Yaroslavl in 2006, where he played eight games before moving later that year to his home town to play for FC Chornomorets Odessa.

International career
Although born in Odessa (today Ukraine), Nizhegorodov preferred to play for the Russia national football team, capping nine games.

Personal life
His son Konstantin Nizhegorodov is now a professional footballer.

Honors as player
Russian Premier League
Winner: 2 (2002, 2004)
Runner-up: 2 ( 2000, 2001)
Russian Cup
Winner: 2 (1999/00, 2000/01)
Russian Super Cup
Winner: (2003)

References

External links

Russian footballers
Russians in Ukraine
Russia under-21 international footballers
Russia international footballers
Russian expatriate footballers
Expatriate footballers in Ukraine
Russian expatriate sportspeople in Ukraine
Expatriate footballers in Austria
FC Lokomotiv Nizhny Novgorod players
FC Lokomotiv Moscow players
FC Akhmat Grozny players
FC Shinnik Yaroslavl players
FC Chornomorets Odesa players
FC Volgar Astrakhan players
SC Rheindorf Altach players
Russian Premier League players
Ukrainian Premier League players
1977 births
Living people
Association football defenders
Footballers from Odesa